Bereznik is a rural locality (a village) in Gamovskoye Rural Settlement, Permsky District, Perm Krai, Russia. The population was 9 as of 2010.

Geography 
Bereznik is located 25 km southwest of Perm (the district's administrative centre) by road. Shulgino is the nearest rural locality.

References 

Rural localities in Permsky District